WNCR-LD, virtual channel 41 (UHF digital channel 21), is a low-powered YTA TV-affiliated television station licensed to Tarboro, North Carolina, United States. The station is owned by On the Map, a for-profit North Carolina multimedia corporation. Founder Ray H. Livesay began operations in 2001 and included the only local, regularly broadcast newscast for the Wilson, Nash, and Edgecombe county areas of Eastern North Carolina.

Its studios and operations are located in Rocky Mount.

Digital channels
The station's digital signal is multiplexed:

References

External links

NCR-LD
Low-power television stations in the United States
Television channels and stations established in 1999
1999 establishments in North Carolina
YTA TV affiliates
NewsNet affiliates
Heartland (TV network) affiliates